Badeh may refer to:
Badeh, Borujerd, a village in Borujerd County, Lorestan Province, Iran
Badeh, Khorramabad, a village in Khorramabad County, Lorestan Province, Iran